The Order of Lakandula is one of the highest civilian orders of the Philippines, established on September 19, 2003. It is awarded for political and civic merit and in memory of King Lakandula’s dedication to the responsibilities of leadership, prudence, fortitude, courage and resolve in the service of one’s people.

Criteria
Its administrative basis is the Honors Code of the Philippines (Executive Order 236, September 19, 2003). In Section 5, II of the Honors Code, the following is provided as the criteria for the conferment of the Order of Lakandula:

Ranks

Grand Collar (Supremo)
Conferred upon an individual who has suffered materially for the preservation and defense of the democratic way of life, or of the territorial integrity of the Republic of the Philippines, or upon a former or incumbent head of state and/or of government.

Grand Cross (Bayani)
Conferred upon an individual who has devoted his life to the peaceful resolution of conflict; upon an individual whose life is worthy of emulation by the Filipino people; or upon a Crown Prince, Vice President, Senate President, Speaker of the House, Chief Justice or the equivalent, foreign minister or other official of cabinet rank, Ambassador, Undersecretary, Assistant Secretary, or other person of a rank similar or equivalent to the foregoing.

Grand Officer (Marangal na Pinuno)
Conferred upon an individual who has demonstrated a lifelong dedication to the political and civic welfare of society; or upon a Chargé d'affaires e.d., Minister, Minister Counselor, Consul General heading a consular post, Executive Director, or other person of a rank similar or equivalent to the foregoing.

Commander (Komandante)
Conferred upon an individual who has demonstrated exceptional deeds of dedication to the political and civic welfare of society as a whole; or upon a Chargé d'affaires a.i., Counselor, First Secretary, Consul General in the consular section of an Embassy, Consular officer with a personal rank higher than Second Secretary, Director, or other person of a rank similar or equivalent to the foregoing.

Officer (Pinuno)
Conferred upon an individual who has demonstrated commendable deeds of dedication to the political and civic welfare of society as a whole; or upon a Second Secretary, Consul, Assistant Director, or other person of a rank similar or equivalent to the foregoing.

Member (Kagawad)
Conferred upon an individual who has demonstrated meritorious deeds of dedication to the political and civic welfare of society as a whole; or upon a Third Secretary, Vice Consul, Attaché, Principal Assistant, or other person of a rank similar or equivalent to the foregoing.

Champion for Life (Kampeon Habang Buhay)
The most recently created rank of the order, it was established in 2006 by President Gloria M. Arroyo. Although this rank was initially positioned after the rank of Pinuno, it was later moved to the level of the Order of National Artists.

It is conferred for outstanding achievement in international sports or beauty events and similar fields of competition and achievement. These achievements should foster national pride and serve as an inspiration to others to achieve excellence. The first recipients were boxer Manny Pacquiao, beauty queen Precious Lara Quigaman, Efren "Bata" Reyes a global icon who revolutionized the sport of pool, Paeng Nepomuceno in 2007 for his three unbroken Guinness World Records in 2007, Filipino athletes who won gold medals at the 2005 Southeast Asian Games, and the Filipino mountaineers who reached the peak of Mount Everest in 2006.

Notable recipients

 Jaime Cardinal Sin: Grand Cross (Bayani), December 8, 2003
 Jose Diokno: Grand Collar (Supremo), 2004 (posthumous)
 James B. Reuter: Grand Cross (Bayani), 2006
 Teodoro Obiang Nguema Mbasogo: Grand Collar (Supremo), May 19, 2006
 Khalifa bin Salman Al Khalifa: Grand Collar (Supremo), January 4, 2007
 Domingo Lucenario Jr.: Grand Officer (Marangal na Pinuno), August 14, 2007
 Lea Salonga: Commander (Kumandante), August 14, 2007
 Juan Carlos I of Spain: Grand Collar (Supremo), December 3, 2007
 Felipe VI of Spain: Grand Cross (Bayani), December 3, 2007
 Efren Peñaflorida: Commander (Kumandante), November 27, 2009
 Shoichiro Toyoda: Grand Collar (Supremo), April 2010
 Manuel V. Pangilinan: Grand Cross (Bayani), June 5, 2010; Commander (Kumandante), May 24, 2006
 Washington SyCip: Grand Cross (Bayani), 2011
 Hillary Rodham Clinton: Grand Cross (Bayani), November 16, 2011
 Sabah Al-Ahmad Al-Jaber Al-Sabah: Grand Collar (Supremo), March 23, 2012
 Hamad bin Khalifa Al Thani: Grand Collar (Supremo), April 10, 2012
 Richard Lugar: Grand Collar (Supremo), June 7, 2012
 Akihito, Emperor of Japan: Grand Collar (Supremo), June 3, 2015
 Galo Ocampo: Grand Officer (Marangal na Pinuno), July 22, 2015 (posthumous)
Alfredo Benjamin Caguioa: Grand Cross (Bayani), June 27, 2016
Adam Malik: Grand Collar (Supremo), August 8, 2017 (Posthumous) 
Abdul Razak: Grand Collar (Supremo), August 8, 2017 (Posthumous) 
S. Rajaratnam:Grand Collar (Supremo), August 8, 2017 (Posthumous) 
Thanat Khoman:Grand Collar (Supremo), August 8, 2017 (Posthumous) 
Narciso Ramos:Grand Collar (Supremo), August 8, 2017 (Posthumous) 
 Enrique Manalo: Grand Cross (Bayani), June 18, 2018

References

External links
 The Order of Lakandula, Official website

 
Lakandula
Lakandula
Establishments by Philippine executive order